Phyllonorycter rongensis is a moth of the family Gracillariidae. It is found in the Albertine Rift valley in Kenya.

The length of the forewings is 2.7 mm. The forewing is elongate and the ground colour is golden ochreous with white markings. The hindwings are narrow, elongate and pointed and the ground colour is pale fuscous. Adults are on wing in early January.

Etymology
The species is named after its type locality, Rongai.

References

Endemic moths of Kenya
Moths described in 2012
rongensis
Moths of Africa

Taxa named by Jurate de Prins